Musa Mohamed Ahmed is a Sudanese politician who was an Assistant to the President of Sudan. He is also the leader of Eastern Front, a rebel group based in eastern Sudan. The Beja Congress (Ahmed's group) and the Free Lions Movement (Mabrouk Mubarak Salim's group) merged to create the movement. The Eastern Front began negotiations in  May 2006 with the Sudanese Government  and concluded them on 14 October 2006 with the signing of a peace agreement. This took place in Asmara, Eritrea.

References 

Sudanese military personnel
Living people
Year of birth missing (living people)